Alzhan Musurbekuly Zharmukhamedov (alternate spelling: Alzan Zarmuhamedov) (Áljan Músirbekuly Jarmuhamedov; ; 2 October 1944 – 3 December 2022) was a Kazakh professional basketball player and coach. He was considered to be the first ethnic Kazakh to become an Olympic champion.

Playing career
Jarmuhamedov played club basketball with CSKA Moscow (1970–1980). In 1971, he earned the title of Master of Sports of the USSR, International Class, and a year later, he was awarded the Order of the Badge of Honor.

Soviet Union national team
While being young and driven by feelings of patriotism, Jarmuhamedov moved to Almaty (Alma-Ata at that time), in order to compete with the senior Kazakh SSR national basketball team. However, not being able to find any support, he finally decided to move to Moscow, where he was eventually able to earn world fame as a basketball player. He served as the team captain of the senior combined national basketball team of the Soviet Union for a long period. He won a gold medal at the 1972 Summer Olympic Games, while playing with the senior Soviet Union national basketball team.

Coaching career
At the tail end of his career, Jarmuhamedov worked as a player-coach, until he reached the age of 45.

Personal life and death
Zharmukhamedov's father was Kazakh and his mother was Ukrainian of Zaporozhian Cossack descent. 

Zharmukhamedov lived in Moscow. He died on 3 December 2022, at the age of 78. He was buried in the Federal Military Memorial Cemetery on 7 December.

Awards and accomplishments

Club career
 10× USSR Premier League Champion: 1970, 1971, 1972, 1973, 1974, 1976, 1977, 1978, 1979, 1980
 FIBA European Champions Cup (EuroLeague) Champion: 1971 
 2× USSR Cup Winner: 1972, 1973
 FIBA European Selection: 1972

Soviet senior national team
 EuroBasket 1967: 
 1970 FIBA World Championship: 
 EuroBasket 1971: 
 1972 Summer Olympic Games: 
 EuroBasket 1975: 
 1976 Summer Olympic Games: :
 1978 FIBA World Championship: 
 EuroBasket 1979:

References

External links
FIBA Profile
FIBA Europe Profile
Basketball-Reference.com Profile

1944 births
2022 deaths
Kazakhstani people of Ukrainian descent
Centers (basketball)
Soviet basketball coaches
Soviet men's basketball players
1970 FIBA World Championship players
1978 FIBA World Championship players
PBC CSKA Moscow players
Olympic basketball players of the Soviet Union
Olympic gold medalists for the Soviet Union
Olympic bronze medalists for the Soviet Union
Basketball players at the 1972 Summer Olympics
Basketball players at the 1976 Summer Olympics
Armed Forces sports society athletes
FIBA EuroBasket-winning players
People from Turkistan Region
Olympic medalists in basketball
Kazakhstani basketball coaches
Kazakhstani men's basketball players
Medalists at the 1976 Summer Olympics
Medalists at the 1972 Summer Olympics
Honoured Masters of Sport of the USSR
Burials at the Federal Military Memorial Cemetery